This is a list of butterflies of Equatorial Guinea. About 269 species or subspecies are known from Equatorial Guinea, 10 of which are endemic.

Papilionidae

Papilioninae

Papilionini
Papilio nireus Linnaeus, 1758
Papilio charopus Westwood, 1843
Papilio cynorta Fabricius, 1793
Papilio dardanus Brown, 1776
Papilio phorcas bardamu Canu, 1994
Papilio phorcas congoanus Rothschild, 1896
Papilio zenobia Fabricius, 1775
Papilio fernandus Fruhstorfer, 1903
Papilio filaprae musolanus (Hancock, 1988)
Papilio hesperus hesperus Westwood, 1843
Papilio hesperus feae Storace, 1963
Papilio menestheus canui Gauthier, 1984

Leptocercini
Graphium antheus (Cramer, 1779)
Graphium policenes (Cramer, 1775)
Graphium biokoensis (Gauthier, 1984)
Graphium colonna (Ward, 1873)
Graphium illyris flavisparsus (Fruhstorfer, 1903)
Graphium illyris hamatus (Joicey & Talbot, 1918)
Graphium ridleyanus (White, 1843)
Graphium leonidas (Fabricius, 1793)
Graphium tynderaeus (Fabricius, 1793)
Graphium latreillianus theorini (Aurivillius, 1881)
Graphium auriger (Butler, 1876)
Graphium fulleri boulleti (Le Cerf, 1912)
Graphium ucalegon (Hewitson, 1865)

Pieridae

Pseudopontiinae
Pseudopontia paradoxa (Felder & Felder, 1869)

Coliadinae
Eurema brigitta (Stoll, [1780])
Eurema hecabe solifera (Butler, 1875)
Eurema senegalensis (Boisduval, 1836)
Catopsilia florella (Fabricius, 1775)

Pierinae
Colotis celimene sudanicus (Aurivillius, 1905)
Nepheronia argia (Fabricius, 1775)
Nepheronia pharis (Boisduval, 1836)
Leptosia alcesta (Stoll, [1782])
Leptosia hybrida Bernardi, 1952

Pierini
Appias epaphia (Cramer, [1779])
Appias phaola (Doubleday, 1847)
Appias sabina (Felder & Felder, [1865])
Appias sylvia (Fabricius, 1775)
Mylothris alcuana Grünberg, 1910
Mylothris basalis Aurivillius, 1906
Mylothris chloris (Fabricius, 1775)
Mylothris hilara furvus Bernardi, 1953
Mylothris hilara goma Berger, 1981
Mylothris jacksoni cederici Collins, 1997
Mylothris rembina (Plötz, 1880)
Mylothris rhodope (Fabricius, 1775)
Belenois aurota (Fabricius, 1793)
Belenois theuszi (Dewitz, 1889)

Lycaenidae

Miletinae

Liphyrini
Aslauga vininga (Hewitson, 1875)

Miletini
Megalopalpus angulosus Grünberg, 1910
Megalopalpus zymna (Westwood, 1851)
Lachnocnema reutlingeri Holland, 1892

Poritiinae

Liptenini
Pentila maculata pardalena Druce, 1910
Pentila bitje Druce, 1910
Pentila cloetensi aspasia Grünberg, 1910
Pentila occidentalium gabunica Stempffer & Bennett, 1961
Telipna albofasciata Aurivillius, 1910
Telipna atrinervis Hulstaert, 1924
Telipna hollandi exsuperia Hulstaert, 1924
Telipna sanguinea (Plötz, 1880)
Ornipholidotos kirbyi (Aurivillius. 1895)
Ornipholidotos ugandae biokoensis Libert, 2005
Ornipholidotos tessmani Libert, 2005
Ornipholidotos ayissii Libert, 2005
Ornipholidotos annae Libert, 2005
Ornipholidotos evoei Libert, 2005
Ornipholidotos nbeti Libert, 2005
Ornipholidotos perfragilis (Holland, 1890)
Torbenia aurivilliusi (Stempffer, 1967)
Mimeresia favillacea (Grünberg, 1910)
Mimeresia libentina (Hewitson, 1866)
Mimeresia moreelsi tessmanni (Grünberg, 1910)
Liptena bolivari Kheil, 1905
Liptena evanescens (Kirby, 1887)
Liptena fatima (Kirby, 1890)
Liptena intermedia Grünberg, 1910
Liptena opaca (Kirby, 1890)
Liptena subundularis (Staudinger, 1892)
Liptena xanthostola (Holland, 1890)
Tetrarhanis laminifer Clench, 1965
Falcuna hollandi suffusa Stempffer & Bennett, 1963
Falcuna libyssa cameroonica Stempffer & Bennett, 1963
Falcuna synesia gabonensis Stempffer & Bennett, 1963
Larinopoda lircaea (Hewitson, 1866)
Larinopoda tera (Hewitson, 1873)
Micropentila brunnea (Kirby, 1887)
Pseuderesia eleaza (Hewitson, 1873)
Eresina rougeoti Stempffer, 1956
Eresiomera isca (Hewitson, 1873)
Eresiomera phaeochiton (Grünberg, 1910)
Eresiomera rougeoti (Stempffer, 1961)
Citrinophila erastus (Hewitson, 1866)

Epitolini
Geritola larae Collins & Libert, 1999
Stempfferia gordoni (Druce, 1903)
Cephetola subcoerulea (Roche, 1954)
Epitolina dispar (Kirby, 1887)
Epitolina melissa (Druce, 1888)
Hypophytala hyettoides (Aurivillius, 1895)
Hypophytala obscura (Schultze, 1916)

Theclinae
Hypolycaena clenchi Larsen, 1997
Hypolycaena liara Druce, 1890
Iolaus eurisus vexillarius Clench, 1964
Iolaus aethria Karsch, 1893
Iolaus cytaeis Hewitson, 1875
Iolaus frater kumboae (Bethune-Baker, 1926)
Iolaus hemicyanus barbara Suffert, 1904
Iolaus alcibiades Kirby, 1871
Pilodeudorix catalla (Karsch, 1895)
Paradeudorix cobaltina (Stempffer, 1964)
Paradeudorix eleala (Hewitson, 1865)
Paradeudorix ituri (Bethune-Baker, 1908)
Deudorix caliginosa Lathy, 1903
Deudorix lorisona (Hewitson, 1862)

Polyommatinae

Lycaenesthini
Anthene mahota (Grose-Smith, 1887)
Anthene scintillula (Holland, 1891)
Cupidesthes thyrsis (Kirby, 1878)

Polyommatini
Pseudonacaduba aethiops (Mabille, 1877)
Oboronia ornata flava Holland, 1920
Oboronia pseudopunctatus (Strand, 1912)

Nymphalidae

Libytheinae
Libythea labdaca Westwood, 1851

Danainae

Danaini
Danaus chrysippus alcippus (Cramer, 1777)
Tirumala formosa morgeni (Honrath, 1892)
Amauris niavius (Linnaeus, 1758)
Amauris tartarea Mabille, 1876
Amauris echeria fernandina Schultze, 1914
Amauris hyalites Butler, 1874
Amauris inferna moka Talbot, 1940
Amauris vashti (Butler, 1869)

Satyrinae

Melanitini
Gnophodes betsimena parmeno Doubleday, 1849
Melanitis leda (Linnaeus, 1758)

Satyrini
Bicyclus buea (Strand, 1912)
Bicyclus dorothea dorothea (Cramer, 1779)
Bicyclus dorothea concolor Condamin & Fox, 1964
Bicyclus feae (Aurivillius, 1910)
Bicyclus hewitsoni (Doumet, 1861)
Bicyclus howarthi Condamin, 1963
Bicyclus italus (Hewitson, 1865)
Bicyclus medontias (Hewitson, 1873)
Bicyclus martius sanaos (Hewitson, 1866)
Bicyclus sandace (Hewitson, 1877)
Bicyclus smithi fernandina (Schultze, 1914)
Bicyclus sealeae Collins & Larsen, 2008
Bicyclus xeneas (Hewitson, 1866)
Bicyclus xeneoides Condamin, 1961

Charaxinae

Charaxini
Charaxes varanes vologeses (Mabille, 1876)
Charaxes fulvescens marialuisae Canu, 1989
Charaxes protoclea cedrici Canu, 1989
Charaxes boueti Feisthamel, 1850
Charaxes castor (Cramer, 1775)
Charaxes brutus angustus Rothschild, 1900
Charaxes pollux annamariae Turlin, 1998
Charaxes eudoxus biokoensis Canu, 1989
Charaxes numenes malabo Turlin, 1998
Charaxes tiridates choveti Turlin, 1998
Charaxes imperialis nathaliae Canu, 1989
Charaxes cedreatis Hewitson, 1874
Charaxes lycurgus bernardiana Plantrou, 1978
Charaxes doubledayi Aurivillius, 1899
Charaxes mycerina nausicaa Staudinger, 1891

Euxanthini
Charaxes eurinome (Cramer, 1775)
Charaxes trajanus (Ward, 1871)

Nymphalinae
Kallimoides rumia jadyae (Fox, 1968)

Nymphalini
Antanartia delius guineensis Howarth, 1966
Vanessa dimorphica mortoni (Howarth, 1966)
Junonia cymodoce lugens (Schultze, 1912)
Salamis cacta (Fabricius, 1793)
Protogoniomorpha parhassus (Drury, 1782)
Hypolimnas anthedon (Doubleday, 1845)
Hypolimnas misippus (Linnaeus, 1764)
Hypolimnas salmacis insularis Schultze, 1920

Cyrestinae

Cyrestini
Cyrestis camillus (Fabricius, 1781)

Biblidinae

Biblidini
Neptidopsis ophione (Cramer, 1777)
Eurytela alinda Mabille, 1893

Epicaliini
Sevenia boisduvali omissa (Rothschild, 1918)

Limenitinae

Limenitidini
Cymothoe capella (Ward, 1871)
Cymothoe fumana balluca Fox & Howarth, 1968
Cymothoe herminia (Grose-Smith, 1887)
Cymothoe indamora canui Beaurain, 1985
Cymothoe jodutta ciceronis (Ward, 1871)
Cymothoe lucasii (Doumet, 1859)
Cymothoe lurida sublurida Fruhstorfer, 1903
Cymothoe oemilius fernandina Hall, 1929
Cymothoe owassae Schultze, 1916

Neptidini
Neptis mixophyes Holland, 1892
Neptis nemetes margueriteae Fox, 1968

Adoliadini
Catuna crithea (Drury, 1773)
Euriphene atossa angusta Hecq, 1994
Euriphene canui Hecq, 1987
Euriphene incerta biokensis Hecq, 1994
Euriphene mundula (Grünberg, 1910)
Euriphene tadema (Hewitson, 1866)
Euriphene lysandra (Stoll, 1790)
Bebearia zonara (Butler, 1871)
Bebearia barce maculata (Aurivillius, 1912)
Bebearia comus (Ward, 1871)
Bebearia paludicola Holmes, 2001
Bebearia staudingeri (Aurivillius, 1893)
Bebearia flaminia (Staudinger, 1891)
Bebearia tessmanni (Grünberg, 1910)
Bebearia cinaethon (Hewitson, 1874)
Bebearia oremansi Hecq, 1994
Euphaedra medon fernanda Hecq, 1981
Euphaedra extensa Hecq, 1981
Euphaedra hewitsoni disclara Hecq, 1991
Euphaedra brevis Hecq, 1977
Euphaedra alava Hecq, 2000
Euphaedra canui Hecq, 1987
Euphaedra janetta insularis Schultze, 1920
Euphaedra splendens Hecq, 1992
Euphaedra harpalyce vana Hecq, 1991
Euphaedra losinga wardi (Druce, 1874)
Euphaedra temeraria Hecq, 2007
Euphaedra vulnerata Schultze, 1916
Euptera elabontas canui Collins, 1995

Heliconiinae

Acraeini
Acraea kraka Aurivillius, 1893
Acraea admatha Hewitson, 1865
Acraea camaena (Drury, 1773)
Acraea eugenia ochreata Grünberg, 1910
Acraea neobule Doubleday, 1847
Acraea annobona d'Abrera, 1980
Acraea abdera Hewitson, 1852
Acraea egina (Cramer, 1775)
Acraea alcinoe camerunica (Aurivillius, 1893)
Acraea epaea insulana Ackery, 1995
Acraea excisa (Butler, 1874)
Acraea macarista latefasciata (Suffert, 1904)
Acraea tellus (Aurivillius, 1893)
Acraea alciope Hewitson, 1852
Acraea bonasia (Fabricius, 1775)
Acraea circeis (Drury, 1782)
Acraea serena (Fabricius, 1775)
Acraea jodutta (Fabricius, 1793)
Acraea lycoa Godart, 1819
Acraea oberthueri Butler, 1895
Acraea orestia Hewitson, 1874
Acraea peneleos Ward, 1871
Acraea pharsalus pharsalus Ward, 1871
Acraea pharsalus carmen Pyrcz, 1991
Acraea orina Hewitson, 1874
Acraea parrhasia limonata Eltringham, 1912

Vagrantini
Lachnoptera anticlia (Hübner, 1819)
Phalanta eurytis (Doubleday, 1847)
Phalanta phalantha aethiopica (Rothschild & Jordan, 1903)

Hesperiidae

Coeliadinae
Coeliades chalybe (Westwood, 1852)
Coeliades forestan (Stoll, [1782])
Coeliades hanno (Plötz, 1879)
Coeliades pisistratus (Fabricius, 1793)

Pyrginae

Celaenorrhinini
Celaenorrhinus illustris (Mabille, 1891)
Celaenorrhinus meditrina (Hewitson, 1877)
Celaenorrhinus pooanus Aurivillius, 1910
Celaenorrhinus rutilans (Mabille, 1877)

Tagiadini
Tagiades flesus (Fabricius, 1781)

Hesperiinae

Aeromachini
Gorgyra sara Evans, 1937
Ceratrichia clara medea Evans, 1937
Ceratrichia flava flava Hewitson, 1878
Ceratrichia flava fernanda Evans, 1937
Ceratrichia nothus makomensis Strand, 1913
Ceratrichia phocion camerona Miller, 1971
Pardaleodes bule Holland, 1896
Pardaleodes edipus (Stoll, 1781)
Xanthodisca astrape (Holland, 1892)
Xanthodisca vibius (Hewitson, 1878)
Osmodes lux Holland, 1892
Caenides soritia (Hewitson, 1876)
Caenides dacela (Hewitson, 1876)
Caenides dacena (Hewitson, 1876)
Melphina statirides (Holland, 1896)

Baorini
Borbo fatuellus (Hopffer, 1855)

See also
Geography of Equatorial Guinea
Atlantic Equatorial coastal forests
Cross-Sanaga-Bioko coastal forests
Mount Cameroon and Bioko montane forests
São Tomé, Príncipe, and Annobón moist lowland forests

References

Seitz, A. Die Gross-Schmetterlinge der Erde 13: Die Afrikanischen Tagfalter. Plates
Seitz, A. Die Gross-Schmetterlinge der Erde 13: Die Afrikanischen Tagfalter. Text (in German)

Butterflies
Equato
Equatorial Guinea
Equatorial Guinea
Butterflies